Colin Kretzmann (born 19 May 1947) is a South African cricketer. He played in five first-class matches for Border from 1968/69 to 1970/71.

See also
 List of Border representative cricketers

References

External links
 

1947 births
Living people
South African cricketers
Border cricketers
Cricketers from East London, Eastern Cape